Turaiha (Turai) is a Tomar Rajput Hindu caste, mostly found in Northern Indian states of United Province, Delhi, Bihar, Bengal and Maharashtra. Main population of Turaiha depends on vegetable & business. In Rohilkhand they known as Turai, Turaha and Turahiya. As similar they found Agra, Gorakhpur, Padrauna (kushinagar) Meerut, Shahjahanpur, Moradabad, Oudh and Benares divisions of United Province.

History
The synonyms of Turaiha people are Turi, Toriya, Turai, Turahiya, Turha or Turaha and Turaiya ,where they are, they usually engaged in fishing, cultivational and fruit selling job. In Gorakhpur and Benares divisions of United Province, they also grow vegetables, take fruit gardens .  Turaiha community is near to Bhil tribe and also treated as Dheevara . They worship Sun god and Chaat mai for their Happiness. They are growing are moving towards the economically stable condition. There is also a small community of Turai people in Sangli, Maharashtra.

Origin
In census report of 1931 A.C. Turner describes,  "Turaha are an offshoot (Branch) from Kahar, who have a sub caste Turai in the plains and of Turaha in Hills. Now they form a distinct caste apart from Kahar. They are unknown about their origin but they accept, they have a relation with Sun God(because they workship God Shani as their east dev or kul devta). They form one endogamous group. The Gotra (Clan) of Turaiha People is Kashyap and they have no sub castes. Marriage by exchange is practiced. The dowry is largely prevalent and is paid in cash and kind but little more. Widow remarriage is freely allowed, and younger brother may take his elder brother's widow to wife if he chooses . Polygamy is permissible but is seldom practiced.  The Turahas cremate their dead.  Turahas take Pakki prepared by Ahirs, Kahar, Nai, Kumhar, Kalwar, Teli, Chamar and Pasi. After independence, Turaiha was declared as scheduled caste in constitution of India."

Belief
The Turaiha are Hindu. They belong to Shiva and Baghwat Sects. Their deities are siloman Baba, Amna Bhawani, Biratiya, Bhairo, Pancho Peer, Ghatoria Baba, Maadho Baba and Kalu Dev. They follows themselves to Guru Machchhendar Nath. They accept Mata Shabari and Veer Eklavya as their ancestors and regards them to frame their pictures in their houses. They celebrate their main festival in the month of Sawan held on last Saturday with offering seven chief grains (Wheat, Rice, Gram, Urd, Barley, Peas and Til) with Bread and Kheer (Jenar). Many people scarifie goats to Sanichar Raja (Sanichara Baba) (Kalaiyan Baba) (Kalu Baba).  Sanichar Raja (Kalu Baba)(Kalaiyan Baba) is the chief deity (kul Devta) of Turaihas.  They have an impermanent panchayat which consists of the whole biradari. The Chaudhri presides and act as the executive officer of the community. Stern action is taken against anyone who fails to obey the panchayat which does not hesitate to order Hukka-Pani band.

Contemporary problems
The main problems of this community are frequent joblessness, lack of education and lifelong poverty.  Turaiha people are mostly Landless labour and live in Kachche Houses. 98% population of Turaiha people are living below poverty level. 0.1% people are educated and Socio-economic condition of the whole community is very poor. In Indian political reference, Caste factor plays an important role in election, so due to minority, lack of organization and disunity, there is no political Sound and Godfather of Turaihas. Although the government has declared Turaiha as schedule caste since 1952, but the beneficiaries are some other majority holding schedule castes only. The main organizations of Turaihas are Bhartiya Turaiha Mahasabha (Regd.) led by Dr. Ram Swaroop Verma {Aligarh}, Akhil Bhartiya Turaiha samaaj (Regd.) headed by Dr. Ram Avtar "Madhur" (Meerut) and Turaiha Machhuaara kanyaan Parishad (Regd.) presided by Dr. Kripaal Singh Turaiha (Rampur). Akhil Bhartiya Turaiha Samaj Bilari (Regd.) presided by Dr. Ajay pal Singh turaiha Vill. Khanduva   Khandua (Moradabad)UP.

Population

India about 609,000
Uttar Pradesh 175,000
Bihar 248,000
West Bengal 96,000
Uttaranchal 10,000
Delhi 55,000
Jharkhand 25,000
Maharashtra 10,000

References

Retrieved January 24, 2019, from http://164.100.129.6/netnrega/state_html/UID_rpt_detail.aspx?DBT=&page=P&type=1&short_name=MH&state_name=MAHARASHTRA&state_code=18&district_name=SANGLI&district_code=1812&block_name=JATH&block_code=&panchayat_name=VHASPETH&panchayat_code=1812005145&fin_year=2014-2015&source=&Digest=NVy2UbhJ4gfnhqi/F4ln+w

Indian castes
Fishing castes
Social groups of Bihar